Sherwin Najito Tugna (born October 15, 1977) is a Filipino lawyer and politician who is the vice mayor of Bocaue, Bulacan. He previously served as a representative for the Citizens’ Battle Against Corruption (CIBAC) party-list group from 2010 to 2019. He served his first term in the House of Representatives of the Philippines after CIBAC won two seats in the 2010 national elections. Tugna would go on to become one of the Assistant Majority Leaders of the 15th Congress. He ran for his third term in Congress through CIBAC Party-List in the 2016 general election where his party won a seat, sending Tugna to the 17th Congress of the Philippines. He presently sits as the Chairman of the House Committee on Suffrage and Electoral Reforms (Journal #8).

Early life 
Sherwin Najito Tugna was born on October 15, 1977. He is the eldest of the two children of Sergio T. Tugna and Mila N. Tugna.

Education 

Tugna attended the Dominican Order-run University of Santo Tomas from grade school up to college. He graduated with a Bachelor of Science in Commerce, Major in Economics degree in 1998. He was a member of the UST Varsity Football Team and competed in University Athletics Association of the Philippines (UAAP) tournaments.

After graduating from college, Tugna joined a pharmaceutical company and worked as a medical representative for 4 years before enrolling in the Juris Doctor program of the Ateneo School of Law where he graduated in 2006. He was accepted to the bar in 2007.

Career 

Before entering the political scene, Tugna worked for two private law firms: Angara Abello Concepcion Regala & Cruz Law Offices and Puyat Jacinto and Santos Law Office.

He was the chairman of the legal affairs committee of the Citizens’ Battle Against Corruption (CIBAC) party-list group and the sitting representative of CIBAC in the House of Representatives.

CIBAC partylist representative (2010–2019) 
Tugna was first elected into office in May 2010 and took his oath of office in August of the same year. He then became one of the Assistant Majority Floor Leaders of the 15th Congress and a member of the following Congressional committees:
 Rules
Assistant Majority Leader (Journal #18)
 Aquaculture and Fisheries Resources
Member for the Majority (Journal #20)
 Banks and Financial Intermediaries
Member for the Majority (Journal #22)
 Basic Education and Culture
Member for the Majority (Journal #20)
 Economic Affairs
Member for the Majority (Journal #72)
 Foreign Affairs
Member for the Majority (Journal #20)
 Good Government and Public Accountability
Member for the Majority (Journal #20)
 Government Enterprises and Privatization
Member for the Majority (Journal #20)
 Trade and Industry
Member for the Majority (Journal #29)
 Transportation
Member for the Majority (Journal #63)

Impeachment participation 

Tugna used his expertise of the law as one of the lead prosecutors during the historic impeachment trial of Chief Justice Renato Corona from January 16 to May 29, 2012. His participation was in conjunction with CIBAC Party’s advocacy of good governance and accountability.

Vice Mayor of Bocaue (2022–present) 
In 2022, he successfully ran for vice mayor of Bocaue under the National Unity Party, alongside his brother-in-law, former Mayor Eduardo "Jon-Jon" Villanueva Jr. He used the nickname "Mr. Mayor Joni" for the official ballot, after his late wife, former Mayor Joni Villanueva. Their candidacy, according to Villanueva, is for the late mayor to continue all the projects she has initiated.

Personal life 
Tugna married Eleanor "Joni" J. Villanueva on May 11, 2002. The couple is blessed with four children, Eleana Doreen, Joaquin Eduardo, Elia Grace, and Lexi Joy. Joni ran for and was elected mayor of Bocaue, Bulacan in 2016. She died on May 28, 2020 from bacterial pneumonia.

Tugna also serves as President and CEO of ZOE Broadcasting Network, the media arm of Jesus is Lord Church of his father-in-law Eddie Villanueva.

References 

1977 births
21st-century Filipino lawyers
Filipino footballers
University of Santo Tomas alumni
Members of the House of Representatives of the Philippines for Citizens' Battle Against Corruption
National Unity Party (Philippines) politicians
People from Bulacan
Living people